"Love Me with All Your Heart" is a popular song, based on the Spanish language song "Cuando calienta el sol", originally composed as "Cuando Calienta El Sol En Masachapa". SADAIC (the Argentine Society of Music Authors and Composers) also credits the Argentine composer, Carlos Albert Martinoli.

The song was made famous first with Spanish lyrics written by the Los Hermanos Rigual (Carlos Rigual and Mario Rigual). The English lyrics are sometimes credited to Michael Vaughn (or Maurice Vaughn) and sometimes to Sunny Skylar. The song was published in 1961. Although both the Spanish and the English versions are love songs, the lyrics are not translations of each other. The Spanish title translates as "When the sun heats (or warms) up".

A version recorded by The Ray Charles Singers went to number three on the Billboard Hot 100 and spent four weeks at number one on the Pop-Standard singles chart in June 1964. U.K singer Karl Denver also had a hit version that reached number 37 in the UK charts in 1964.

Notable recorded versions

 The Bachelors (#38 US Pop, 1966)
 Engelbert Humperdinck (1970)
 Johnny Rodriguez (#7 US country hit in 1978)

Charts

See also
List of number-one adult contemporary singles of 1964 (U.S.)

References

External links
Song lyric (including original Spanish lyric and a French version)

1961 songs
1964 singles
Nicaraguan songs
Songs written by Sunny Skylar
The Bachelors songs